Showgirl: Homecoming Tour was the ninth concert tour by Australian singer Kylie Minogue, in support of her second major greatest hits compilation, Ultimate Kylie (2004). The tour began on 11 November 2006 in Sydney, Australia at the Sydney Entertainment Centre and concluded on 23 January 2007 in London, England at Wembley Arena, consisting of 20 shows in Australia and 14 shows in England.

Minogue was originally scheduled to perform in Australia and Asia during Showgirl: The Greatest Hits Tour in 2005, but the dates were postponed due to her breast cancer diagnosis. The tour resumed the following year, with a revised set list and new costumes. To accommodate Minogue's medical condition and conserve her strength, both alterations to the choreography and longer breaks between show sections were introduced.

Background
For the Homecoming Tour, the show was re-vamped and re-structured into a new production. The tour initially started as an Australian-only tour, to compensate those shows cancelled from the previous tour; however, fourteen shows were scheduled in the United Kingdom due to popular demand, with the Asian shows from Showgirl being indefinitely cancelled.

Concert synopsis

The show was split into seven acts: Homecoming, Everything Taboo, Samsara, Athletica, Dreams, Pop Paradiso, Dance of the Cybermen, with the addition of an encore and an interval. The show opens with an instrumental introduction, featuring writing on the video screen introducing Minogue. She then rises out of the stage on a platform dressed in a pink showgirl outfit. She opens the show with "Better the Devil You Know", which is quickly followed by a performance of "In Your Eyes". After addressing the audience, Minogue introduced and sang new song "White Diamond", and then "On a Night Like This", which begins in the style of a ballad, before resuming with the original after the first chorus. The ending is in the same style as the beginning of the song, where Minogue is taken below the stage, closing the section. The second section begins with a dance interlude, that uses excerpts of "Shocked" and "Do You Dare?", before Minogue rises out of the centre of the stage as "Shocked" is heard. She sings up to the middle eight, before a short segue is played using excerpts of "It's No Secret", "Keep on Pumpin' It", "Give Me Just a Little More Time" and "What Kind of Fool (Heard All That Before)", which leads into a one-verse-one-chorus performance of "What Do I Have to Do", which is followed by another segue using an excerpt of "Over Dreaming (Over You)" and then a performance of "Spinning Around", which is followed by a dance interlude after the middle eight using excerpts of "Step Back in Time" and "Such a Good Feeling".

The third section begins with a dance interlude, followed by a performance of "Confide in Me", where the dancers treat Minogue as if she were a puppet. This is quickly followed by a performance of "Cowboy Style", which is followed by a small interlude of "Finer Feelings", where the backing vocalists sing whilst Minogue performs a dance; this is then followed by a performance of "Too Far". The fourth act begins with a dance interlude of the Sandstorm Dub of "Butterfly", where acrobat Terry Kvasnik dances round the stage; after this, "Red Blooded Woman" is performed, using an excerpt of "Where the Wild Roses Grow"; Minogue this time is rising atop a pommel horse in a leopard onesie. Minogue then performed "Slow", which was followed by a performance of "Kids" before a short interval.

The fifth section begins with a cover of "Somewhere Over the Rainbow" where Minogue rises from behind the stage on a sequined moon. This is then followed by a torch version of "Come into My World". Minogue then performed a shortened version "Chocolate" on the stage, which morphs at the end of the catwalk to form a "cake", from which she sings "I Believe in You". The act closes with a performance of "Dreams". The next act opens with an interlude of Minogue's song "Burning Up", mashed with Madonna's "Vogue". She then goes on to perform a jazz version of "The Locomotion" which is followed by a performance of "I Should Be So Lucky", which samples "The Only Way Is Up". Minogue closed the section with a remix of "Hand on Your Heart". The penultimate section opens with a remix of "Can't Get You Out of My Head", leading into the countdown of "Light Years"; this version of the song is mashed up with song "Turn It into Love". Minogue then performed a two-song encore, performing a sing-a-long version of "Especially for You", inviting the audience to sing Jason Donovan's part. Minogue then closed the show with a performance of "Love at First Sight". with a video montage of her career shown on the video screens behind her.

Critical reception

Showgirl: The Homecoming Tour received positive reviews from critics. Christine Sams in a review for The Sydney Morning Herald described the show as an "extravaganza" and wrote that it was "nothing less than a triumph". The Ages Patrick Donovan wrote that Minogue "looked fit and healthy and was in good voice". He also wrote that she was "at her best prowling the stage in a catsuit, playing up to the crowd". CBBC Newsround described the tour as the "perfect comeback" due to its "range of songs, excellent dancers, stage lighting and Kylie's love of performing".

Broadcasts and recordings

Minogue's performance in Melbourne, Australia on 11 December 2006 was filmed for television and DVD release. The concert premiered on 13 January 2007 in the United Kingdom on Channel 4. On 4 March 2007, the Australian Broadcasting Corporation broadcast the performance without commercial interruptions. The concert was released to DVD on 10 December 2007 as a double disc set with Minogue's documentary film White Diamond.

Minogue's second Australian concert in Sydney on 12 November 2006 was recorded and released as a live album in January 2007. Showgirl Homecoming Live featured a guest appearance by U2 lead singer Bono on the song "Kids". The album reached number seven on the UK Albums Chart and was certified silver."British sales certificate for Showgirl Homecoming Live". British Phonographic Industry. 16 February 2007. Retrieved 7 January 2008.

Set listAct 1: Homecoming 
"Showgirl Theme" (Instrumental Introduction)
"Better the Devil You Know"
"In Your Eyes"
"White Diamond"
"On a Night Like This"Act 2: Everything Taboo'
"Shocked" (contains excerpts from "Do You Dare?", "It's No Secret", "Give Me Just A Little More Time", "Keep on Pumpin' It" and "What Kind of Fool (Heard All That Before)")
"What Do I Have to Do?" (contains excerpt from "I'm Over Dreaming (Over You)")
"Spinning Around" (contains excerpts from "Step Back in Time" along with elements of "Finally" and "Such a Good Feeling") 

Act 3: Samsara
"Temple Prequel" (Interlude)
"Confide in Me"
"Cowboy Style"
"Finer Feelings" (Performed by backing vocalists)
"Too Far"

Act 4: Athletica
"Butterfly" (Sandstorm Dub) (Dance Interlude)
"Red Blooded Woman" (contains excerpts from "Where the Wild Roses Grow")
"Slow"
"Kids"

Act 5: Dreams
"Rainbow Prequel" (Interlude)
"Over the Rainbow"
"Come into My World"
"Chocolate"
"I Believe in You"
"Dreams" (contains excerpts from "When You Wish upon a Star")

Act 6: Pop Paradiso
"Burning Up" / "Vogue"
"The Locomotion"
"I Should Be So Lucky" (contains excerpts from "The Only Way Is Up")
"Hand on Your Heart"
Act 7: Dance of the Cybermen
"Space Prequel" (Interlude)
"Can't Get You Out of My Head" (contains excerpts from "Rise of the Cybermen" along with elements of the "Doctor Who Theme")
"Light Years" / "Turn It into Love" (contains elements of the TARDIS dematerializing)

Encore
"Especially for You" (Intro contains an excerpt of "Love's in Need of Love Today")
"Love at First Sight"

Tour dates

Show cancellations
On 13 January 2007 at the Manchester Evening News Arena in Manchester, England, Minogue was forced to end her concert after performing for an hour due to illness. Minogue's spokesman later confirmed that she had been diagnosed with a respiratory tract infection. Two additional scheduled performances at the Manchester Evening News Arena were postponed and all were rescheduled to the end of January 2007.

Personnel

Kylie Minogue - executive producer
Terry Blamey   - executive producer
William Baker - creative director and designer
Steve Anderson - musician production
 Kevin Hopgood - production manager
Alan MacDonald - production design
 John Galliano - costume design
Karl Lagerfeld - costume design
Dolce & Gabbana - costume design, shoes
Addae Gaskin - costume design
Gareth Pugh  - costume design
Matthew Williamson for Emilio Pucci - costume design
Bvlgari - jewelry 
 Manolo Blahnik - shoes
Stephen Jones - millinery
Rafael Bonachela - choreographer
Akram Khan - choreographer
Michael Rooney - choreographer
Sean Fitzpatrick - tour manager
Andrew Small - drums
Steve Turner - keyboards
Chris Brown - bass
Mark Jaimes - guitar
 Valerie Etienne - backing vocals
Hazel Fernandez - backing vocals
Janet Ramus - backing vocals
Dance Captain: Annoulka Yanminchev
Dancers: Jason Beitel - dancer
Marco Da Silva - dancer
Jamie Karitzis - dancer
Alan Lambie - dancer
Welly Locoh Donou - dancer
Claire Meehan - dancer
Jason Piper - dancer
 Nikoletta Rafaelisova - dancer
 Andile Sotiya - dancer
Nikki Trow - dancer
Rachel Yau - dancer
Terry Kvasnik - acrobat

References

External links
Kylie's Official Site
"2006/2007 Showgirl – Homecoming Tour"

2006 concert tours
2006 in Australian music
2007 concert tours
2007 in Australian music
December 2006 events in Australia
December 2006 events in the United Kingdom
January 2007 events in the United Kingdom
Kylie Minogue concert tours
November 2006 events in Australia